Brandon Michael Crawford (born January 21, 1987) is an American professional baseball shortstop for the San Francisco Giants of Major League Baseball (MLB).

Crawford played college baseball for the University of California, Los Angeles (UCLA). He was selected in the fourth round of the 2008 MLB draft by the Giants.

He made his MLB debut in 2011. He was the sixth player in MLB history to hit a grand slam in his first MLB game, and the first shortstop to hit a grand slam in an MLB postseason game. He is a three-time All-Star (2015, 2018, and 2021), four-time Gold Glove Award winner (2015–2017, and 2021), two-time Wilson Defensive Player of the Year Award winner (2012 and 2016), and won the Silver Slugger Award at shortstop in 2015. Crawford has played the most games at shortstop for the Giants in franchise history, and at the end of the 2022 season was 2nd of all active players in games played at shortstop.

Early life
Crawford is a native of the San Francisco Bay Area. He was born in Mountain View, and his family lived in Menlo Park before they moved to Pleasanton when he was in elementary school, which is where he grew up.  He grew up a San Francisco Giants fan, and his family purchased season tickets and a commemorative brick in Willie Mays Plaza outside AT&T Park when the ballpark opened in 2000.

Crawford attended Foothill High School in Pleasanton, where he was a three-sport athlete playing football, basketball, and baseball. He was the starting quarterback for the Foothill Falcons, and graduated in the class of 2005.

College career

Crawford attended the University of California, Los Angeles (UCLA), where he was a physiological sciences major. He played baseball for the UCLA Bruins from 2006 to 2008, and helped lead the team to the NCAA Regionals in three consecutive seasons, the first time in school history. Crawford was named the team's MVP in 2006 and 2007, and was named to the All-Pac-10 Conference team in 2007. In the summer of 2007, he played for the Orleans Cardinals of the Cape Cod Baseball League. He also played in the Northwoods League for the Mankato MoonDogs in 2005 before he attended UCLA.

He helped lead the United States national team to the title in the 2006 International University Sports Federation (FISU) World Championship.

Professional career

Draft and minor leagues
The San Francisco Giants selected Crawford in the fourth round, with the 117th overall selection, of the 2008 MLB draft by the Giants, and signed for a $375,000 signing bonus.  Crawford started his first full season as a professional with the Class-A Advanced San Jose Giants in 2009.  In 25 games, he hit .371 with six home runs and 17 RBIs, good enough for a slugging percentage of .600 and 1.045 OPS.  In May, Crawford was promoted to the Double-A Connecticut Defenders, where he spent the rest of the season, batting .258/.294/.365  with four home runs in 108 games.

In 2010, Crawford opened the season in Double-A (now with the Richmond Flying Squirrels) and earned an Eastern League mid-season All-Star nod, batting .241/.337/.375 in 79 games before suffering a broken hand in early July, which sidelined Crawford for nearly two months.  When he recovered, he was assigned back to San Jose for the remainder of the season.  He was ranked the sixth-best prospect in the Giants' organization by Baseball America heading into 2011.

In 2011, Crawford was invited to spring training but was set back by a broken finger suffered in the final week, and started the season in San Jose while he recovered. There he batted .322/.412/.593 in 59 at bats. Then in AAA he batted .234/.291/.327 in 107 at bats.	 In the AFL, he was named to the AFL All-Prospect Team.

San Francisco Giants (2011–present)

2011

He was called up to the MLB for the first time on May 26, 2011, following injuries to Buster Posey, Mike Fontenot, and Darren Ford. Crawford made his MLB debut on May 27 against the Milwaukee Brewers. His first MLB hit came in his third at bat of the game, and was a grand slam off the Brewers' Shaun Marcum. He joined Bobby Bonds and Brian Dallimore as the only Giants whose first career MLB hit was a grand slam; he also became the sixth player in MLB history and the second player in Giants history along with Bobby Bonds to hit a grand slam in his first game.

On July 31, he was optioned to the Giants' Triple-A affiliate, the Fresno Grizzlies, after the Giants acquired shortstop Orlando Cabrera. The Giants were 23–18 with Crawford as a starter, but he was only hitting .190. Crawford was recalled in September when MLB rosters expanded to 40 players.

2012
In 2012, Crawford was named the team's opening day shortstop, in which he batted 8th in the lineup.  He batted .248 with four home runs, 26 doubles, and 45 RBI in 143 games.  On July 20, Crawford hit his second career grand slam and drove in 5 runs as the Giants defeated the Philadelphia Phillies 7–2. Crawford was praised for his defense during the 2012 postseason, which culminated in a 4–0 sweep of the Detroit Tigers in the 2012 World Series.  Crawford ranked third among NL shortstops in Defensive Runs Saved at +12, and was recognized with the Wilson Defensive Player of the Year Award at shortstop.

2013
Crawford was the Giants' starting shortstop for 2013, with Joaquín Árias as his backup. In 149 games on the year, he hit .248/.311/.363 with 9 home runs and 43 RBI.

2014
In 153 games, Crawford batted .246 and set career highs with ten home runs and 69 RBIs.  On April 13, Crawford hit a tenth inning, walk-off home run against Rex Brothers of the Colorado Rockies. In the 2014 postseason, Crawford led all Giants with 9 RBIs.  In the 4th inning of the NL Wild Card Game between the Giants and Pittsburgh Pirates, Crawford hit a grand slam off of Edinson Vólquez, becoming the first shortstop to hit a grand slam in Major League Baseball postseason history.  Crawford batted .304 (7-for-23) with 4 RBIs in the 2014 World Series, en route to his second championship with the Giants.  In Game 7, Crawford drove in the second run for the Giants with a sacrifice fly and, along with second baseman Joe Panik, turned a critical double-play in the third inning.

2015
On January 27, 2015, the Giants and Crawford avoided arbitration by agreeing to a one-year, $3.175 million deal.  On May 16, Crawford hit his third career grand slam (fourth including the postseason) and drove in a career-high six runs against Mike Leake of the Cincinnati Reds. In May, Crawford led the team in RBIs, and on July 1, Crawford set a new career-high with his 11th home run of the season.  On July 6, Crawford was voted by his fellow Major League players as a reserve for the 2015 MLB All-Star Game. On August 14 at AT&T Park, in an 8–5 win over the Washington Nationals, Crawford hit his 100th career double.  On September 24 at Petco Park, Crawford hit his twentieth home run of the season off of Ian Kennedy, making him the fourth Giants shortstop in franchise history to reach the milestone, after Rich Aurilia, Alvin Dark, and Travis Jackson.

Crawford set career highs in several offensive categories, batting .256 with 21 home runs, 84 RBIs, 33 doubles, and 130 hits.  Crawford was the first Giants' shortstop to lead the team in home runs since Bill Dahlen in 1905.  He won his first Rawlings Gold Glove Award and Silver Slugger Award, the first Giant to win both awards in the same year since Barry Bonds in 1997.

2016
After the 2015 season, Crawford and the Giants agreed to a six-year, $75 million contract through the 2021 season.  The deal covered Crawford's final two years of salary arbitration and first four years of free agency. The contract includes a no-trade clause, meaning that Crawford has to give consent if he were to be traded.

April 8, 2016, Crawford hit a tenth inning, walk-off home run off Joe Blanton of the Los Angeles Dodgers in a game in which the Giants had been no-hit through 7 innings and recorded only two hits.  On August 8 at Marlins Park, in an 8–7 win over the Miami Marlins that went into extra-innings, Crawford hit a career-high in base hits and singles with seven and five respectively. His seven hits tied the NL record for most total hits in a single game, and was the first time this feat had been done since Rennie Stennett in 1975. The seven hits were also a Giants all-time franchise record. Two days later, Crawford met with Stennett at Marlins Park.

For the 2016 season, Crawford increased his batting average to a career-best .275 in 155 games played.  Along with teammate Javier López, Crawford won the Willie Mac Award, which honors the Giants' most inspirational player.  He was awarded his second consecutive Gold Glove Award after the season.

2017
On April 29, 2017, Crawford was placed on the 10-day disabled list due to a right groin strain.  In 2017, he batted .253/.305/.403 with 14 home runs and 77 RBI, and after the season he was awarded his third consecutive Gold Glove Award.  He was the first shortstop to win three straight since Jimmy Rollins (2007–09), and the first Giant since J. T. Snow who won four in a row (1997–2000).

2018

On June 27, 2018, Crawford hit a walk-off home run against the Colorado Rockies to win the game 1–0 for the Giants. Crawford became the first Giants player since Steve Decker in April 1991 to hit a walk-off solo homer to win a 1–0 game.  Batting .300 with ten home runs and 39 RBIs, Crawford was named the starting shortstop for the 2018 MLB All-Star Game. Crawford hit .193 in the second half, battling injuries throughout the second half.  A left-handed hitter, Crawford had a higher batting average against left-hand pitching than right-hand pitching at .274.  His average against right-hand pitching was .243.

For the season, he hit a .254/.325/.394 batting line. He had the slowest baserunning sprint speed of all major league shortstops, at 25.9 feet/second.

In 2018, Crawford was the Giants team winner of the Heart & Hustle Award. Crawford lost out on his 4th straight gold glove to Arizona Diamondbacks shortstop Nick Ahmed.

2019
Against the Rockies on July 15, 2019, he had five hits in six at bats including two home runs and a career-high eight runs batted in during the Giants' 19-2 victory. The eight RBIs tied the San Francisco team record held by Willie Mays and Orlando Cepeda. Crawford became the first shortstop in history to record five hits and eight RBIs in one game, and the first Giant to have at least 2 home runs  and 8 RBIs in a game since Willie Mays did it in 1961.

In 2019, he batted .228/.304/.350 with 11 home runs and 59 RBIs.

2020
In 2020 he batted .256/.326/.465 (the highest slugging percentage of his career) with 8 home runs and 23 RBIs. He had the slowest sprint speed of all major league shortstops, at 25.7 feet per second.

2021
On June 8, 2021, Crawford started in what was his 1,326th game playing shortstop for the Giants, passing Travis Jackson for the most games played at the position in franchise history. On August 13, Crawford agreed to a 2-year extension worth $32 million through 2023.

In the 2021 regular season, Crawford batted .298(9th in the NL)/.373(10th)/.522 with 79 runs, 24 home runs, 11 stolen bases, and 90 RBIs (all career highs). In 138 games he had 549 at bats. On defense, he had a .983 fielding percentage (3rd in the NL), and a 3.76 range factor/game (3rd). At the end of the season he was 3rd of all active players in games played at shortstop, at 1,409.

In Game 3 of the 2021 NLDS, Crawford made a leaping catch to preserve a crucial 1-0 lead for the Giants, which held to give the Giants a 2-1 series lead.

He won the 2021 National League Gold Glove Award at shortstop. With four Gold Glove Awards he became tied with former first baseman J.T. Snow for third-most in Giants history.

He was named a 2021 Silver Slugger Award finalist. He placed 4th in National League MVP voting.

2022
In 2022 with the Giants he batted .231/.308/.344 in 407 at bats, with 9 home runs and 52 RBIs, as on defense he led the NL in range factor per game at shortstop (3.88). He was second of all active players in career games at shortstop (1,525).

2023
Following the offseason departure of fellow infielder Brandon Belt, Crawford became the longest tenured member of the Giants.

Personal life
Crawford married former UCLA gymnast Jalynne Dantzscher in Kona, Hawaii, on November 26, 2011. They have two daughters and two sons. They reside in Scottsdale, Arizona.

Crawford is the brother-in-law of Olympic gymnast Jamie Dantzscher. Crawford's sister Amy is married to pitcher Gerrit Cole. His sister-in-law, Jennifer Pippin, died in 2017 due to an asthma attack.

During the MLB players weekend promotion, Crawford uses the nickname "DJ BC Raw" and sports it on his jersey.  His nickname refers to his constant use of a speaker in the team clubhouse.

See also

 List of Major League Baseball annual triples leaders
 List of Major League Baseball career assists as a shortstop leaders
 List of Major League Baseball career games played as a shortstop leaders
 List of Major League Baseball single-game hits leaders
 List of University of California, Los Angeles people

References

Further reading 
 "Brandon Crawford 'looks like a movie star,' and definitely enjoying the ride" ESPN, June 15, 2015

External links

 (shared with Brandon Belt)
Brandon Crawford profile at UCLA Bruins

1987 births
Living people
Arizona League Giants players
Baseball players from California
Connecticut Defenders players
Fresno Grizzlies players
Gold Glove Award winners
Major League Baseball shortstops
National League All-Stars
Orleans Firebirds players
People from Menlo Park, California
People from Pleasanton, California
Richmond Flying Squirrels players
Salem-Keizer Volcanoes players
San Francisco Giants players
San Jose Giants players
Scottsdale Scorpions players
Silver Slugger Award winners
UCLA Bruins baseball players
World Baseball Classic players of the United States
2017 World Baseball Classic players
Mankato MoonDogs players